South Brother Island may refer to:

 North and South Brother Islands, New York, in New York State, USA off the coast
 South Brother Island, Connecticut, USA, in the Atlantic Ocean off Eat Lyme
 South Brother (Chagos Bank) (Île du Sud), one of the Three Brothers islands in the Chagos Archipelago, British Indian Ocean Territory
 South Brother Island, India, in the Andaman Islands, Indian Ocean
 South Brother Island (Ounḏa Kômaytou), one of the Seven Brothers (islands) in Bab-El-Mandeb strait, Djibouti
 South Brother Island, one of the Rukan Islands in Indonesia
 South Brother Island, one of The Brothers in New Zealand

See also 
 Brother Island (disambiguation)
 North Brother Island (disambiguation)